The women's marathon (T54) at the 2022 Commonwealth Games, as part of the athletics programme, was held in Birmingham on 30 July 2022.

Records
Prior to this competition, the existing world and Games records were as follows:

Schedule
The schedule was as follows:

Results
The results of the Women's T54 marathon were as follows:

References

Women's marathon (T54)
2022 in women's athletics
Comm
2022 Commonwealth Games